Soe Thein (born 7 September 1949 in Rangoon, Burma), also spelt Soe Thane, served as  Minister of the President's Office of Myanmar (Burma) between 2011 and 2016 and a former Minister for Industry-2 of Myanmar (Burma) in 2010-2012  He previously served as the Commander in Chief of the Myanmar Navy and is a retired Vice Admiral. After Ministry 1 and 2 have been combined, he was served as Minister for Industry. He also served as the Chairman of Myanmar Investment Commission from 2010-2013.

Soe Thein has been accused of buying votes in Bawlakhe twice, in 2015 and in 2020. He won that constituency both times.

Personal life

Soe Thein is married to Khin Aye Kyin, also called Aye Aye. He has one son, Aye Chan (b. 1973), and 2 daughters, Yimon Aye (b. 1980) and Thida Aye (b. 1979). Thida Aye is a director at the Singaporean investment firm Dymon Asia, while Aye Chan is an Executive Director of an e-commerce site called RGO47. Yimon Aye is an assistant professor of chemistry at EPFL.

References

Government ministers of Myanmar
Burmese military personnel
People from Yangon
1949 births
Living people
Defence Services Academy alumni
Burmese generals
Union Solidarity and Development Party politicians
Members of Pyithu Hluttaw